Asanpur  is a village development committee in Siraha District in the Sagarmatha Zone of south-eastern Nepal. At the time of the 2011 Nepal census it had a population of 12926 people living in 2510 individual households.

The main bazaar is Golbazar, which contains the entire economic, medical and other facilities available for the VDC.  It lies on the side of Mahendra Highway. It is one of the main business areas of the district. Most banks have branches here. There are huge number of establishments of Sahakari Sansthan. Some of the famous temples are Dhaminthan, Shiva Mandir, and Durga Mandir.

References

External links
UN map of the municipalities of  Siraha District
Golbazar-Youth-Association

Populated places in Siraha District